Amaryllis is a genus of amphipods belonging to the family Amaryllididae. The genus was first described in 1879 by William Aitcheson Haswell, and the type species is Amaryllis macrophthalma Haswell, 1879 (by subsequent designation).

The species of this genus are found in Southern Hemisphere.

Species:

Amaryllis atlantica 
Amaryllis brevicornis 
Amaryllis carrascoi 
Amaryllis croca 
Amaryllis dianae 
Amaryllis kamata 
Amaryllis keablei 
Amaryllis macrophthalma 
Amaryllis maculata 
Amaryllis migo 
Amaryllis moona 
Amaryllis olinda 
Amaryllis philatelica 
Amaryllis quokka 
Amaryllis spencerensis

References

Amphipoda
Malacostraca genera
Crustaceans described in 1879
Taxa named by William Aitcheson Haswell